Sanji may refer to:

 Changji or Sanji, city in Xinjiang, China
 Sanji, Fujian, village in Nanping, Fujian, China
 Sanji (director), Sanji Senaka, an American music video director
 Sanji (given name), a masculine Japanese given name
 Sanji (One Piece), fictional character in the One Piece manga and anime series

See also
 Senji (disambiguation)